Christophe Marchand (born August 6, 1972, in Villeparisis, Seine-et-Marne) is a retired freestyle swimmer from France. He competed at two consecutive Summer Olympics for his native country, starting in 1988. He twice claimed the gold medal at the Mediterranean Games in the men's 400 metres freestyle event.

References

1972 births
Living people
People from Villeparisis
French male freestyle swimmers
Olympic swimmers of France
Swimmers at the 1988 Summer Olympics
Swimmers at the 1992 Summer Olympics
European Aquatics Championships medalists in swimming
Mediterranean Games gold medalists for France
Swimmers at the 1991 Mediterranean Games
Swimmers at the 1993 Mediterranean Games
Sportspeople from Seine-et-Marne
Mediterranean Games medalists in swimming
20th-century French people
21st-century French people